Central Bureau of Statistics may refer to:

 Central Bureau of Statistics (Aruba)
 Israel Central Bureau of Statistics
 Central Bureau of Statistics (Namibia)
 Central Bureau of Statistics (Nepal)
 Central Bureau of Statistics (North Korea)
 Palestinian Central Bureau of Statistics
 Central Bureau of Statistics (Sudan)
 Central Bureau of Statistics (Syria)
 Statistics Netherlands, formerly known as the Central Bureau of Statistics

See also 
 List of national and international statistical services
 Central Statistical Office